The Keneder yiddishe vochenblatt, known as the Vochenblatt, was a Yiddish-language communist newspaper in Canada, published from Toronto from 1926 to 1979. Vochenblatt was one of the major communist Yiddish newspapers in the world during the Cold War. The newspaper was edited by Joshua Gershman until his death in 1978.

History
The newspaper was launched in 1926 as Der kampf ('The Struggle') by the Communist Party of Canada, with Joshua Gershman as editor.  The paper was renamed Der veg ('The Road'), and finally Der keneder yidishe vochenblatt in October 1940.' The title 'Vochenblatt' was perceived as more 'safe' by the party, seeking to avoid state interference in its press activities. Harry Guralnick served as the executive secretary of the Canadian Jewish Weekly Association, the organization that published the newspaper.

In March 1943 Vochenblatt began including English pages regularly, in an effort to reach out to English-speaking Jews. Nathan Cohen served as editor of the English pages and wrote theatre and film reviews. The English-language section of Vochenblatt was later replaced by a monthly supplement, the Canadian Jewish Outlook, which later became a standalone publication.

Initially, Vochenblatt adopted a firm anti-Zionist stand, but that posture was softened as World War II progressed. The newspaper was supportive of calls from the Zionist leadership in Palestine to support the Allies. As of mid-1942, Vochenblatt began using the term Eretz Yisrael for Palestine. Still, the newspaper still maintained its support for the  Birobidzhan movement. During the 1941–1945 period the newspaper supported the foundation of an independent joint Jewish-Arab state in Palestine. As of 1948 Vochenblat favoured the establishment of a Jewish state in Palestine, and as the Arab–Israeli War began it issued a call to Canadian Jews to campaign against any compromise against the UN resolution on establishing a Jewish state in Palestine.

In 1948, the newspaper became the de facto organ of the United Jewish People's Order. Gershman served as general secretary of UJPO. UJPO cut its ties and financial relationship with the newspaper when it severed its affiliation to the Communist Party of Canada (then known as the Labor-Progressive Party) at the end of 1956.

In its later years, Vochenblat was published biweekly, rather than every week.

See also
 Keneder Adler

References

External links
Vochenblatt archives

1940 establishments in Ontario
1979 disestablishments in Ontario
Ashkenazi Jewish culture in Toronto
Communism in Canada
Defunct newspapers published in Ontario
Jewish anti-Zionism in Canada
Jewish newspapers published in Canada
Newspapers published in Toronto
Newspapers established in 1940
Publications disestablished in 1979
Secular Jewish culture in Canada
Weekly newspapers published in Ontario
Yiddish culture in Canada
Yiddish communist newspapers